The Battle of Saada was a military confrontation that erupted in March 2011 between Houthi rebels and tribal forces loyal to Yemeni President Ali Abdullah Saleh in the northern city of Saada. Following days of heavy clashes, the Houthis managed to capture the entire Saada Governorate including its provincial capital and established an independent administration, thereby marking the first such Yemeni governorate to fall out of central government control since the nationwide uprising began in 2011. Saada later becomes known as the Houthi stronghold since its takeover.

Background

Houthi rebellion in Sa'dah

Sa'dah has been a site of violent confrontations for years between the Yemeni government and the rebels known as the Houthi movement. The conflict was sparked in June 2004 by Ali Abdullah Saleh government's attempt to arrest Hussein Badreddin al-Houthi, the Zaydi religious leader who founded the Houthi movement and a former Al-Haqq parliamentarian on whose head the government had placed a US$55,000 bounty.

Though the manhunt eventually led to the killing of Hussein Badreddin al-Houthi in September 2004, the conflict continues to rage for another six wars known as the "Sa'dah War" which lasted until 2010. With one of his brothers Abdul Malik al-Houthi succeeded as the new Houthi leader, the movement has been transformed from a grassroot Zaydi religious revivalist network into a strong fighting insurgent forces since then.

By 2009, Houthi rebels have also expanded their insurgency beyond Sa'dah governorate which took place at Saudi territories near the Saudi border. Saudi Arabian military intervened in November 2009 to support the Yemeni government action against the Houthis. The war has reached into a protracted state in 2010 as neither the Houthi rebels could gain control any areas in Sa'dah, nor the government forces were able to subdue the rebellion. A few months later, a fragile truce brokered by Qatar had been reached for all sides during the following year, which temporarily halted all fighting afterwards.

The conflict saw ceasefires being reached many times. A ceasefire, brokered in June 2007, was followed by a peace agreement in February 2008. By April 2008, however, the peace process was in jeopardy as each side of the conflict accused the other of failing to implement aspects of the peace agreement.

Analysts warned that the conflict will damage the humanitarian situation in the region. By mid-2010, it was estimated that there were 342,000 internally displaced persons (IDPs) in Sa'dah as a result of the conflict.

The Yemeni uprising
In the wake of Arab Spring which overthrown rulers in Tunisia and Egypt, a nationwide uprising was soon building up in Yemen in January 2011. The Houthis declared their support for the uprising against Ali Abdullah Saleh and large crowds of Houthi followers joined the anti-government protests on their 10th day. During February and March, thousands of protesters held weekly marches in Sa'dah city from the gates of the old city to the security barracks of Saleh's army to demand the resignation of Ali Abdullah Saleh as Yemeni president.

Meanwhile, skirmish clashes broke out as early as January on the outskirts of Sa'dah city between the Houthis and the Al Abdin tribe led by Sheikh Uthman Mujalli, a vocal anti-Houthi tribal leader. Mujalli was also a Salafi parliamentarian from Sa'dah governorate representing the ruling General People's Congress (GPC) party. A few weeks after the clashes started, the student protest movement that began in the capital Sana'a soon spread to other parts of Yemen. Houthi rebels then began laying siege to Mujalli and his followers. Sa'dah provincial government later came under increasing pressure as anti-government protests grew as well as gradual local security collapse.

Storming of Sa'dah
On 18 March, government snipers fired on a mass protest in the Yemeni capital Sana'a. Known as the "Karama Massacre", the event triggered nationwide outrage and a flood of defections from the government officials.

In response to the bloody event, Houthi rebels stormed Sa'dah city next day on 19 March, allegedly blowing up houses and inflicting heavy civilian casualties. This led to a heavy conflict with the Al Abdin tribes in which 45 people were killed and 13 houses were destroyed. Houthis then attacked Telmus military site, overlooking the city and captured numerous machine guns, mortar shells, guns and tanks. Houthis prevailed in the fighting and burned down Sheikh Mujalli's house, destroying all his possessions and seizing sixteen cars. Sheikh Mujalli and his followers were chased out from Sa'dah as a result of his increasing local unpopularity there.

Sa'dah governor Taha Hajer also fled the province to Sana'a and police deserted their posts, after which all the leaders of the Sa'dah army headquarters handed over their military equipment and bases to the Houthi rebels. The armed defectors mostly consists of troops from 1st Armoured Division (Firqa) led by Ali Mohsen al-Ahmar who declared support for the uprising as well.

By 26 March, Houthi rebels were in full control of the city, running all the government facilities and control checkpoints and controlling all entrances to the city. This marked the first such Yemeni provincial capital to fell out from central government control since the uprising erupted.

Aftermath
On 26 March, Houthi field commander Abu Ali Abdullah al-Hakim al-Houthi appointed Fares Manaa, one of the Middle East's most prominent arms dealers and former ally to Saleh, as governor of Saada. Manaa broke with Saleh after he had been imprisoned by him for months in Sanaa and he resigned from GPC party to join forces with the Houthis along with several other prominent Saada politicians. Houthis later declared a separate administration fully independent from the government of Yemen, consisting of rebels, residents and defected military commanders.

The Houthi takeover of Saada resulted in over four years of relative peace and stability in the governorate until the Yemeni Civil War in 2015.

Since then, Saada Governorate became famously known as the Houthi stronghold where prominent leaders such as Abdulmalik al-Houthi are believed to be residing.

See also
Siege of Dammaj
Houthi takeover in Yemen

References

Military operations involving Yemen
Sa'dah
2010 in Yemen
Houthi insurgency in Yemen
Yemeni Crisis (2011–present)
March 2011 events in Asia
Saada Governorate
Battles in 2011